Żyraków  is a village in Dębica County, Subcarpathian Voivodeship, in south-eastern Poland. It is the seat of the gmina (administrative district) called Gmina Żyraków.

The village has a population of 1,400.

References

Villages in Dębica County